The Staël von Holstein family is a Baltic German Baronial family originating from Westphalia.

History
The family, which originated from ancient Rhenish-German nobility, came to Sweden from Livonia during the 17th century via the Polish Major Hildebrand Staël. The family was naturalized as Swedish Nobility on 14 October 1652, and the family was introduced at the Swedish House of Knights on 20 September 1675.

Currently the family has been divided in rank and station: one side of the family was raised to baronial status (Swedish: Friherrelig) in Sweden; another, to baronial level within the Russian Empire in 1869. The family has also been introduced in the Estonian and Latvian Houses of Nobility.

Famous representatives of the house in chronological order:
Johann Stael von Holstein (died 1512), Member of the Livonian Order and Vogt of Järvamaa
Matthias Stael von Holstein (died 1649)
Jakob Staël von Holstein (1628–1679), Swedish military officer and Marshall von Livonia
Johann Staël von Holstein (1636–1703), Swedish military officer and Gutsherr in Ingria
Matthias Gustav Stael von Holstein (1666–1720), Swedish military officer
Otto Wilhelm Staël von Holstein (1668–1730), Swedish baron and military officer
Fabian Ernst Stael von Holstein (1672–1730), Swedish Lieutenant General and Provost of the Baltic Knighthoods
Jakob Axel Staël von Holstein (1680–1730), Swedish military officer
George Bogislaus Staël von Holstein (1685–1763), Swedish field marshal and governor
Johann Staël von Holstein (1698–1751)
Jakob Johann Stael von Holstein (1699–1755)
Matthias Gustav Stael von Holstein (1702–1754)
Fabian Ernst Stael von Holstein (1727–1772), Balto-German politician and head of the Baltic Knighthoods
Baron Erik Magnus Staël von Holstein (1749–1802), Swedish baron and diplomat, Ambassador to France and husband of Anne Louise Germaine de Staël (1766–1817)
Corfitz Ludwig Staël von Holstein (1753–1819), Swedish military officer and diplomat
Karl Gustav Stael von Holstein (1761–1816), Russian military officer
 Anne Louise Germaine de Staël (1766–1817), French writer, known as Madame de Staël, née Necker
 Matthias Georg Stael von Holstein (1769–1853)
 Johann Alexander Staël von Holstein (1798–1868), Russian military officer
 Berend Fabian Staël von Holstein (1810–1898), Russian major-general
 Otto Wilhelm Staël von Holstein (1834–1902), Swedish jurist
 Mathilda Staël von Holstein (1876–1953), Swedish jurist 
 Alexander von Staël-Holstein (1877–1937), Estonian orientalist, sinologist and indologist
 Nicolas de Staël (1914–1955), French painter
 Johan Staël von Holstein (born 1963), Swedish IT entrepreneur
 Baron Jan Stael von Holstein (born 1939) Swedish, Professor, Tongji University, Shanghai, China.
 David Yen von Staël-Holstein (born 1991)
 Markus Staël von Holstein (born 1994)

References
Swedish House of Knights, http://riddarhuset.se/

External links
Personal website of the Stael von Holstein family in German
Personal website of the Stael von Holstein family in Germany, Livonia and Sweden (in Swedish and in English)

Swedish noble families
Russian nobility
Baltic nobility
German noble families